Nicholas Walsh may refer to:
Nicholas Walsh (bishop) (died 1585), bishop of Ossory in the Church of Ireland
Nicholas Walsh (judge) (1542–1615), Irish judge, politician and landowner
Nicholas Walsh (soccer), Australian footballer 
Nicolas Walsh (physician), American physiatrist
Nicolas Eugene Walsh (1916–1997), American prelate of the Roman Catholic Church
Nicholas Walsh (Home and Away), fictional character on the Australian soap opera Home and Away
Nicholas Welsh or Walsh, MP for Gloucestershire
Nick Walshe (born 1974), English rugby union footballer
Nick Walsh (singer), lead singer of Canadian band Slik Toxik
Nick Paton Walsh (born 1977), British journalist
Nick Walsh (referee), Scottish football referee
Nick Walsh (footballer) (born 1965), Australian rules footballer